MusicMaster may refer to:

Fender Musicmaster: an electric guitar
Musicmaster (software): a music scheduling program for Windows.
Music Master: an international record label company
MusicMaster (music notation software): a music notation software package